Millie Bright (born 21 August 1993) is an English professional footballer who plays as a defender for Chelsea and the England national team. She previously played for Doncaster Belles, Leeds Ladies  and represented England on the under-19 and under-23 national teams.

Bright was named Vauxhall England Young Player of the Year in 2016. With Chelsea, she won three league titles in 2015, 2017–18, and 2019–20, as well as the 2015 and 2017–18 FA Women's Cup. In 2020, she helped the club win the 2020 Women's FA Community Shield.

Bright was named to the PFA Team of the Year for the 2017–18 and 2019–20 seasons. In 2020, she was named to the FIFA FIFPro Women's World11.

Early life
Born in Chesterfield in the East Midlands region of England, Bright spent her youngest years immersed in equestrianism. She developed pneumonia as a baby and spent some of her early childhood in the hospital with bouts of asthma. As a youth, Bright attended Sheffield Road School and Killamarsh Junior School, followed by Eckington School.  Bright began playing football at age nine. After watching a friend play for Killamarsh Dynamos, a local team in Derbyshire, she decided to join. She was later scouted by Sheffield United and joined their academy team until age 16 before moving to Doncaster Rovers Belles in 2009.

Club career

2009–2015: Doncaster Rovers Belles 
Described by the club as "a tall, powerful, athletic striker with an good eye for goal," Bright made her Belles debut as a substitute against Watford at the Keepmoat Stadium in August 2009. She scored her first goal on the occasion of her first start, in the following month's 5–0 FA Women's Premier League Cup win at Leeds City Vixens. She was awarded a contract for the inaugural 2011 season of the FA WSL, making five substitute appearances. At her own request, Bright then went on loan to Leeds United in their 2011–12 FA Women's Premier League season and debuted on her 18th birthday, scoring a goal after entering play as a substitute.

When Bright returned to Doncaster she had developed into a regular first team starter. Bright was critical of The Football Association's decision to demote Doncaster Rovers Belles from the WSL in favour of Manchester City one game into the 2013 season: "It was heartbreaking. It felt like we weren't respected or even wanted in the league, purely based on money. It should be about the level you play at, not how much money you have. That season, we just felt what's the point?"

2015–: Chelsea 
In December 2014, Bright signed with Chelsea ahead of the 2015 season. Chelsea assistant manager Paul Green said of the signing, "Millie is a great character and a young player who is hungry to develop and improve her game. She has a lot of experience for a 21-year-old and has already played a lot of games in the FA WSL and knows what the league is all about. She will add strength and physicality to the squad and I’m sure that she will prove to be a good addition to this talented group of players as we look to build on last season’s achievements." Chelsea finished in first place during the regular season with a  record and qualified for the 2016–17 UEFA Women's Champions League for the second time in the team's history. Bright made fourteen appearances for Chelsea during the 2015 season tallying a total of 906 minutes. She was named Chelsea Players’ Player of the Year by her teammates.

During the 2016 season, Bright was a starting defender in all 15 games that she played and scored a goal in the team's 5–0 win over Sunderland. Chelsea finished in second place with a  record.

Bright was Chelsea's starting left-side defender for the 2017 FA WSL Spring Series and helped lead the defensive line to concede only five goals in all competitions. She scored two goals during attacking set-pieces against Bristol and Arsenal. Chelsea won the Spring Series with a  record.

In August 2018, Bright signed a new three-year contract with Chelsea. Of the signing, she said, "I just want to be a successful player and to help my team-mates and this football club win more trophies. We've already won a few in my time here and hopefully we can continue that and keep winning things, and I hope the Champions League is one of those trophies. We made a big statement in the competition last season and we're ready to keep developing and take the next step."

During the 2019–20 FA WSL season, Bright was named the league's Player of the Month for December after she scored and provided an assist against Birmingham and led the Chelsea defense in a shut-out against Manchester United. Chelsea won the regular season with a  record as well as the 2019–20 FA Women's League Cup after defeating Arsenal 2–1 in the Final.

When the 2020 Women's FA Community Shield was played for the first time since 2008, Bright scored Chelsea's game-winning goal from long range during the team's 2–0 over Manchester City.

International career 
Bright has represented England on the senior national team as well as numerous youth national teams, including the under-19 and under-23 national team squads. In June 2016, she scored a penalty kick goal against the United States during the final game of the Nordic Cup.

Bright earned her first cap for the senior England national team in September 2016, as a last-minute substitute in a 2–0 win over Belgium. In February 2019, Bright pulled out of the England squad for the SheBelieves Cup due to injury, and was replaced by Gemma Bonner.

In May 2019, Bright was selected to represent England at the 2019 FIFA Women's World Cup in France.
She played in two of the three group matches as well as in the Round of 16, Quarter Final and Semi Final. She was sent off in the 2–1 semifinal loss to the United States after receiving a second yellow card. She captained England for the first time in a friendly game against Canada on 13 April 2021. She was again called on to captain the squad by head coach Sarina Wiegman in the two November World Cup qualifiers against Austria and Latvia.

In June 2022, Bright was included in the England squad which won UEFA Women's Euro 2022.

Career statistics

International
Statistics accurate as of match played 11 July 2022.

International goals
As of match played 11 July 2022. England score listed first, score column indicates score after each Bright goal.

Honours
Chelsea
FA WSL: 2015, Spring Series, 2017–18, 2019–20, 2020–21, 2021–22
FA Women's Cup: 2014–15, 2017–18 2020–21, 2021–22
FA Women's League Cup: 2019–20, 2020–21
FA Community Shield: 2020
UEFA Women's Champion's League runners-up: 2020–21

England

UEFA Women's Championship: 2022
Arnold Clark Cup: 2022, 2023

Individual
Vauxhall England Young Player of the Year: 2016
 FA WSL PFA Team of the Year: 2017–18, 2019–20, 2021–22
 FA Women's Super League Player of the Month: December, 2019
FIFA FIFPro Women's World11: 2020, 2021
Arnold Clark Cup Golden Boot: 2022
Freedom of the City of London (announced 1 August 2022)

See also 
 List of UEFA Women's Championship goalscorers
 List of England women's international footballers

References

Further reading
 Aluko, Eniola (2019), They Don't Teach This, Random House, 
 Caudwell, Jayne (2013), Women's Football in the UK: Continuing with Gender Analyses, Taylor & Francis, 
 Dunn, Carrie (2019), Pride of the Lionesses: The Changing Face of Women's Football in England, Pitch Publishing (Brighton) Limited, 
 Dunn, Carrie (2016), The Roar of the Lionesses: Women's Football in England, Pitch Publishing Limited, 
 Grainey, Timothy (2012), Beyond Bend It Like Beckham: The Global Phenomenon of Women's Soccer, University of Nebraska Press,

External links

 Profile at the Chelsea F.C. website
 Profile at the Football Association website
 
 

1993 births
Living people
English women's footballers
England women's international footballers
England women's under-23 international footballers
Olympic footballers of Great Britain
Women's association football midfielders
Chelsea F.C. Women players
Doncaster Rovers Belles L.F.C. players
Women's Super League players
People from Killamarsh
Footballers from Derbyshire
Sheffield United W.F.C. players
2019 FIFA Women's World Cup players
Footballers at the 2020 Summer Olympics
UEFA Women's Euro 2022 players
UEFA Women's Championship-winning players
UEFA Women's Euro 2017 players